The Young Lions Cup was a professional wrestling championship contested for in the American professional wrestling promotion Chikara.

History

A tournament is held every year to determine the champion. Originally, experience level was the primary basis for eligibility in the tournament, as the first tournament was only open to those who have wrestled under 50 professional matches. The primary basis for eligibility was later changed to age, making the tournament open only to wrestlers who are 25 years old or younger. The winner of the Young Lions Cup can defend the cup as an actual title until the following tournament, and Young Lions Cup tournament winners are not allowed to compete in the tournament again once they win it.

The original rules also once stated that previous holders of the cup are not allowed to compete for the title once they are no longer champion, but this rule was 'changed' in 2008. Fire Ant was granted a rematch after losing the cup to Vin Gerard, and Director of Fun Leonard F. Chikarason claimed that the rules were now amended, stating that previous holders of the cup could challenge for the cup again any time they wanted until the next Young Lions Cup tournament. However, on February 1, 2010, new Director of Fun Dieter VonSteigerwalt reverted the rule change and announced that former champions could no longer challenge for the cup or enter the annual tournaments.

Though Chikara's one-year hiatus ended in May 2014, the title was never mentioned for a prolonged period. On September 18, it was announced that an eleventh tournament would be done and hosted by Chikara's sister promotion, Wrestling is Fun! (WiF!), from October 11 to November 1. The finals of the tournament took place on December 6 at Tomorrow Never Dies and saw Heidi Lovelace become the first female holder of the title.

The title has been deactivated following the closure of Chikara in June, 2020. There have been a total of 28 cup winners over a total of 16 cups, some of them winning the same cup on more than one occasion and three vacancies. The first holder was Hallowicked and the last one was Ricky South until the closure of the promotion.

Title history
{| class="wikitable sortable" width=100% style="text-align:center;"
!width=2%|
!width=15%|Wrestler:
!width=2%|Cup:
!width=10%|Date:
!width=3%|Days held:
!width=10%|Location:
!width=6%|Successful defenses
!width=63%|Notes:
!width=3%|
|-
!1
|
|
|
|
|
|
|align=left|
|
|-style="background:#e3e3e3" 
|—
|Vacated
|
|July 10, 2004
|
|
|
|
|
|-
!2
|
|
|
|
|
|
|align=left|
|
|-
!3
|
|
|
|
|
|
|align=left|
|
|-style="background:#e3e3e3" 
|—
|Vacated
|
|July 22, 2005
|
|
|
|
|
|-
!4
|
|
|
|
|
|
|align=left|
|
|-style="background:#e3e3e3" 
|—
|Vacated
|
|June 23, 2006
|
|
|
|
|
|-
!5
|
|
|
|
|
|
|align=left|
|
|-
!6
|
|
|
|
|
|
|align=left|
|
|-style="background:#e3e3e3" 
|—
|Vacated
|
|June 22, 2007
|
|
|
|
|
|-
!7
|
|
|
|
|
|
|align=left|
|
|-
!8
|
|
|
|
|
|
|align=left|
|
|-style="background:#e3e3e3" 
|—
|Vacated
|
|June 13, 2008
|
|
|
|
|
|-
!9
|Fire Ant
|
|
|
|
|
|align=left|
|
|-
!10
|
|
|
|
|
|
|align=left|
|
|-style="background-color:#e3e3e3"
|—
|Vacated
|
|
|
|N/A
|align="center"|N/A
|align=left|
|
|-
!11
|
|
|
|
|
|
|align=left|
|
|-style="background:#e3e3e3" 
|—
|Vacated
|
|August 14, 2009
|
|
|
|
|
|-
!12
|
|
|
|
|
|
|align=left|
|
|-
!13
|
|
|
|
|
|
|align=left|
|
|-style="background:#e3e3e3" 
|—
|Vacated
|
|August 27, 2010
|
|
|
|
|
|-
!14
|
|
|
|
|
|
|align=left|
|
|-style="background:#e3e3e3" 
|—
|Vacated
|
|August 27, 2011
|
|
|
|
|
|-
!15
|
|
|
|
|
|
|align=left|
|
|-style="background:#e3e3e3" 
|—
|Vacated
|
|June 23, 2012
|
|
|
|
|
|-
!16
|
|
|
|
|
|
|align=left|
|
|-style="background:#e3e3e3" 
|—
|Vacated
|
|June 2, 2013
|
|
|
|
|
|-
!17
|
|
|
|
|
|
|align=left|
|
|-style="background:#e3e3e3" 
|—
|Vacated
|
|February 6, 2016
|
|
|
|
|
|-
!18
|
|
|
|
|
|
|align=left|

|
|-style="background:#e3e3e3" 
|—
|Vacated
|
|February 4, 2017
|
|
|
|
|
|-
!19
|
|
|
|
|
|
|align=left|
|
|-
!20
|
|
|
|
|
|
|align=left|
|
|-
!21
|
|
|
|
|
|
|align=left|
|
|-
!22
|
|
|
|
|
|
|align=left|
|
|-
!23
|Razerhawk
|
|
|
|
|1
|align=left|
|
|-
!24
|Ophidian (II) / The Whisper
|
|
|
|
|2
|align=left|

|
|-style="background:#e3e3e3" 
|—
|Vacated
|
|March 17, 2018
|
|
|
|
|
|-
!25
|Cam Zagami
|
|
||
|
|1
|align=left|
|
|-
!26
|Danjerhawk
|XIV
|
||
|
|3
|align=left|
|
|-style="background-color:#e3e3e3"
|—
|Vacated
|XIV
|
|
|N/A
|N/A
|align=left|
|
|-
!27
|Still Life with Apricots and Pears
|XV
|March 16, 2019
|
|
|10
|align=left|
|
|-style="background-color:#e3e3e3"
|—
|Vacated
|XIV
|
|
|N/A
|N/A
|align=left|
|
|-
!28
|Ricky South
|XVI
|January 18, 2020
|
|
|0
|align=left|
|
|-style="background-color:#e3e3e3"
|—
|Deactivated
|XVI
|
|
|N/A
|N/A
|align=left|
|
|-

Cup reigns

{| class="wikitable sortable" style="text-align: center"
!Rank
!Wrestler
!No. ofcup
!Combineddefenses
!Combined days
|-
!1
|  || I || 4 || 602
|-
!2
| Heidi Lovelace || XI || 2 || 429
|-
!3
| The Estonian ThunderFrog || XII || 4 || 364
|-
!4
|  || VIII || 7 || 363
|-
!5
|  || III || 2 || 334
|-
!6
| Still Life with Apricots and Pears || XV || 10 || 308
|-
!7
|  || IX || 2 || 301
|-
!8
| Mark Angelosetti || X || 6 || 288
|-
!rowspan=2|9
| Danjerhawk || XIV || 3 || 245
|-
|  || II || 4 || 245
|-
!11
|  || IV || 5 || 237
|-
!12
| Helios || V || 3 || 230
|-
!13
| Tim Donst || VII || 4 || 208
|-
!14
|  || VI || 2 || 201
|-
!15
|  || VII || 3 || 168
|-
!16
| Ophidian II/The Whisper || XIII || 2 || 167
|-
!17
| Ricky South || XVI || 0 || 158
|-
!18
| Vin Gerard || VI || 4 || 154
|-
!rowspan=2|19
|  || IV || 3 || 125
|-
| Chuck Taylor || V || 2 || 125
|-
!21
|  || II || 0 || 111
|-
!22
| Cam Zagami || XIV || 3 || 105
|-
!23
| Razerhawk || XIII || 1 || 84
|-
!24
| Wani || XIII || 0 || 64
|-
!25
| Space Monkey || XIII || 0 || 56
|-
!26
| Hermit Crab || XIII || 1 || 35
|-
!27
| Fire Ant || VI || 0 || 28
|-
!28
| Sylverhawk || XIII || 1 || 14
|-

See also

Chikara Campeonatos de Parejas
Chikara Grand Championship

References

External links
Title history at ChikaraPro.com
Title history at Wrestling-Titles.com
CHIKARA Young Lions Cup Championship

Chikara (professional wrestling) championships